The Horn River is a river in the Northwest Territories of Canada. It is a major tributary of the Mackenzie River.

The river gives the name to the Horn River Formation, a shale deposit of the Western Canadian Sedimentary Basin. The Horn River Basin refers to the extent of the Horn River Formation in the subsurface, and is not defined by the Horn River watershed.

Course
The river originates south of the Great Bear Lake. It flows south-east through a series of rapids north of the Horn Plateau, then has a meandered flow. Fawn Lake is a complex wetland formed along the middle course of the Horn River, and is followed downstream by the Second Lake. The river turns south-west, where the Mink Lake is formed along its course. The Laferte River also flows into the Mink Lake.

The arch made by the river defines the Horn Plateau, a flat elevated area that rises up to ) to the north and east, while the south is defined by the Mackenzie River east of Fort Simpson.

Tributaries
From origin to mouth, the Horn River receives:

See also
List of rivers of the Northwest Territories

Rivers of the Northwest Territories
Tributaries of the Mackenzie River